Ajit Das Gupta (22 August 1924 – 10 July 2011) was an Indian cricketer. He played eight first-class matches for Bengal between 1949 and 1955.

See also
 List of Bengal cricketers

References

External links
 

1924 births
2011 deaths
Indian cricketers
Bengal cricketers
Cricketers from Kolkata